Rosalía Lázaro is a Paralympian athlete from Spain competing mainly in category F12 long jump events.

Lázaro has competed in every summer Paralympics from 1992 to 2008. She has always competed in the long jump but has also competed in the 100m in 1992 and 2008 and the pentathlon in 1996. Across all these games she has won three medals, all in long jump, her first was a silver in the F10/11 class in 1996, she improved on this in 2000 winning the F12 class before winning a second silver in the F12 class in 2004.

External links
 profile on paralympic.org

Paralympic athletes of Spain
Athletes (track and field) at the 1996 Summer Paralympics
Athletes (track and field) at the 2000 Summer Paralympics
Athletes (track and field) at the 2004 Summer Paralympics
Paralympic gold medalists for Spain
Paralympic silver medalists for Spain
Living people
Paralympic athletes with a vision impairment
Medalists at the 1996 Summer Paralympics
Medalists at the 2000 Summer Paralympics
Medalists at the 2004 Summer Paralympics
Year of birth missing (living people)
Paralympic medalists in athletics (track and field)
Spanish female long jumpers
Spanish female sprinters
Visually impaired long jumpers
Visually impaired sprinters
Paralympic sprinters
Paralympic long jumpers
Spanish blind people